Guilt Is Not Mine or Unjust Condemnation (French: L'injuste condamnation, Italian: L'ingiusta condanna) is a 1952 French-Italian melodrama film co-written and directed by Giuseppe Masini and starring Rossano Brazzi, Gaby André and  Elvy Lissiak.

Plot    
We are in Maremma. A doctor who devotes himself to scientific research falls in love with Anna, the daughter of a chemist, who does not approve of the relationship. He is thus courted by other women, among which Barbara proves to be the most enterprising: meanwhile Anna gets engaged and the young doctor begins to suffer. When a malaria epidemic breaks out, the scientist is accused of not thinking about healing the locals to continue scientific experiments, undergoes a trial and ends up in prison.

Cast
 Rossano Brazzi as Carlo Rocchi
 Gaby André as Anna Valli
 Sergio Tofano as Prof. Valli
 Elvy Lissiak as Barbara Soldani 
 Umberto Sacripante as Dante
 Mino Doro as Archeologo
 Fedele Gentile as Ferri
 Ubaldo Lay as Andrea
 Amedeo Trilli as Sindaco
 Gianna Segale as Gianna
 Guido Riccioli as Oste
 Nanda Primavera as Ostessa
 Enzo Staiola

References

External links
 

1952 films
1950s Italian-language films
Films scored by Alessandro Cicognini
Italian drama films
French drama films
1952 drama films
Italian black-and-white films
1950s Italian films
1950s French films